This is a list of traditional windmills in the American state of Illinois.

Windmills having coordinates below can be seen together in "Map all coordinates using OpenSourceMap" at right.

Notes

Known building dates are in bold text. Non-bold text denotes first recorded date. Iron windpumps are outside the scope of this list unless listed on the National Register of Historic Places.

References

Windmills
Illinois
Windmills